Midland Provincial Park is a provincial park located in Alberta, Canada.

Once the site of the Midland Coal Mine, it was designated as a provincial park on June 5, 1979. It now hosts the Royal Tyrrell Museum of Palaeontology. The Midland Coal Mine was the site of a large mining disaster in the mid-1920s; many men died in a mine explosion.

It is located 6 km west of Drumheller on Highway 838 (North Dinosaur Trail).

Activities in the park include canoeing, kayaking, fishing, wildlife viewing and hiking through willows and cottonwoods along the Red Deer River. Points of interest are fossil beds, a mine site and the Royal Tyrrell Museum of Palaeontology.

See also
List of provincial parks in Alberta

External links

Park page at Alberta Development
Virtual tour
Drumheller Mining History
The Dangers of Coal Mining in Drumheller

Provincial parks of Alberta
Starland County
Coal mines in Canada
Protected areas established in 1979
Badlands of Canada
Former mines in Canada